Sun and Moon is the first full-length studio album by Korean-American singer-songwriter Sam Kim, released on November 22, 2018, by Antenna Music. It was preceded by the promotional EP Sun and Moon Pt. 1 on October 23, 2018, consisting of three songs later included in the full album release: "Sun and Moon", "Make Up" (featuring Crush) and "Sunny Days, Summer Nights".

Track listing
Credits adapted from Antenna Music website.

Personnel
Credits adapted from Antenna Music website and album preview video.

Musicians
 Sam Kim – vocals ,  backing vocals , guitars 
 Hong So-jin – piano , synth , electric piano , organ , synth bass , strings , string arrangement , recording direction
 Jukjae – drums , guitars , bass , recording direction
 Crush – vocals , backing vocals , recording direction 
 Zico – vocals , backing vocals 
 Choi In-sung – bass 
 Kim Seung-ho – drums 
 Joo Hyun-woo – brass arrangement , saxophone 
 Kim Sung-min – trumpet  
 Woo Sung-min – trombone 
 Kang Chan-wook – cello 
 Park Yong-eun – viola  
 Im Hong-kyun – violin  
 Song Hae-rim – violin  
 Park In-young – string arrangement and conducting  
 L.A. String Ensemble – strings  

Engineers
 Ji Seung-nam – mixing, recording direction
 Kwon Nam-woo – mastering
 Yang Seo-yeon – mastering assistant
 Kim Il-ho – mastering assistant
 Kwak Dong-joon – mastering assistant

Chart performance

Weekly charts

Monthly charts

Release history

References

2018 debut albums
Sam Kim albums